Kumaranwali is a town located in Punjab, Pakistan.

Villages in Punjab, Pakistan